Johnsons Hill is a rural locality in the Rockhampton Region, Queensland, Australia.

Road infrastructure
The Burnett Highway runs along the northern boundary.

References 

Suburbs of Rockhampton Region
Localities in Queensland